Midway Island is an unincorporated community in Stafford County, Virginia, United States. It lies at an elevation of 164 feet (50 m).

Midway Island was the name of a subdivision consisting of off-base housing for Marines stationed at nearby Quantico. It was torn down and is now the site of the Naval Research Laboratory's Midway Research Center.

References

Unincorporated communities in Stafford County, Virginia
Unincorporated communities in Virginia